Events in the year 1202 in Norway.

Incumbents
Monarch: Sverre Sigurdsson then Haakon III Sverresson

Events
25 January - The siege of Tønsberg Fortress ends. The commander of the fort Reidar Sendemann and his men surrenders to King Sverre of Norway.

Arts and literature

Births

Deaths
9 March – Sverre of Norway, King (born c. 1145/1151 ).
Inge Magnusson,  pretender to the Norwegian throne (born c. 1182).

References

Norway